Ctenicera elegans is a species of click beetles.

References 

 A generic reclassification of the North American Ctenicerini (Coleoptera: Elateridae: Denticollinae). PJ Johnson, 1992

External links 

 
 Ctenicera elegans at insectoid.info

Elateridae
Beetles described in 1837